Bernhard Pickl (born 3 March 1991) is an Austrian sport shooter.

He participated at the 2018 ISSF World Shooting Championships, winning a medal.

References

External links

Living people
1991 births
Austrian male sport shooters
ISSF rifle shooters
People from Scheibbs District
Shooters at the 2019 European Games
European Games medalists in shooting
European Games silver medalists for Austria
Sportspeople from Lower Austria
20th-century Austrian people
21st-century Austrian people